Eero Juhani Saksela (born 6 January 1937) is a Finnish professor of medicine.

He was born in Helsinki. He became a physician and took his medical doctorate in 1962. Having been chief physician at the Helsinki University Central Hospital, he was a professor of pathological anatomy at the University of Helsinki from 1981 to 2001.

Saksela was awarded the Matti Äyräpää Prize in 1983. He is a member of the Norwegian Academy of Science and Letters.

He is the father of Kalle Saksela.

References

1937 births
Living people
Finnish physicians
Academic staff of the University of Helsinki
Members of the Norwegian Academy of Science and Letters